The Mercedes-AMG G 65 (previously sold as Mercedes-Benz G 65 AMG) is a V12 engined (with twin turbochargers) version of the Mercedes-Benz G-Class. The vehicle weighs  (US model as estimated by an automotive magazine publication) and has 603 hp going into a seven-speed transmission as of 2016. In the United States it cost $224,000 USD in the year 2016, another source says it cost $218,000 USD. It was noted as being cheaper than a previous limited production run of Mercedes-Benz G63 AMG 6x6 (old-style name) from 2013. (note in this period of the 2010s, transition AMG vehicles from Mercedes-Benz to Mercedes-AMG branding. The US Version was previewed at the New York Auto Show in the spring of 2015 as a Mercedes-AMG model.

The basic model was introduced in Europe in 2012 and in 2015 was introduced in the United States as a Mercedes-AMG brand model. Prior to its US launch, Daimler experienced sales of over 3000 G-class vehicles of which about half were the AMG specification version. The car tuner Brabus also made a version of the G65.

Mercedes-AMG is a brand of Daimler AG (Mercedes-Benz, Unimog, AMG, and Smart).

The 2018 model for the USA has the AMG bi-turbocharger V-12 producing 621 horsepower and 738 lb-ft (US units). This is connected to a 7-speed transmission and full-time four wheel drive drivetrain. The G65 is more oriented towards urban driving, with low-profile tires and a 0- time of 5.1 seconds making it fastest of MB G-Class models offered then.

Specifications

Size: 
Wheelbase 112.2 in
Length 188.5 in
Width 73.0 in
Weight:
Fuel Capacity:
25.4 gallons (about 96.15 litres) 

Max angle of approach:
36 degrees
Max angle of departure:
27 degrees

See also
Mercedes-AMG
List of Mercedes-Benz vehicles
Mercedes-Benz G500 4×4²

References

External links
MB-USA page for G65 (2018)

Mercedes-Benz G-Class